Malbasey is a small village in West Sikkim surrounded by forest. It falls under Soreng Sub-division and is the home place of former chief minister of Sikkim Shri Nar Bahadur Bhandari. There is a school named Don Bosco School Malbasey,  situated at the top of the village.

References

Villages in Gyalshing district